A hydrogen analyzer is a device used to measure the hydrogen concentration in steels and alloys. It also has industrial applications for corrosion monitoring.

See also
 Hydrogen embrittlement
 Hydrogen leak testing
 Hydrogen sensor

Hydrogen technologies
Metallurgical processes